CoKu Tau/4 is a pre-main-sequence binary T Tauri star system in the constellation Taurus. The stars are surrounded by a circumbinary disc with a central cavity of radius 10 astronomical units. Before its binary nature was known, the central cavity in the system's disc was thought to have been cleared out by a planet of at least 10 Jupiter masses, a rare example of a so-called "transitional disc". This model was disproven in 2008 when the star was resolved using adaptive optics as a system of two near-equal-mass stars with a projected separation of 8 AU. The central cavity is thus cleared out by the stars, not by the gravitational influence of a planet.

References
 Ireland & Kraus (2008): The Disk Around CoKu Tauri/4: Circumbinary, Not Transitional
 How Nature Builds a Planet, Adam Frank, Discover 26 (#7, July 2005); accessed online 1-II-2007.
 On the Planet and the Disk of CoKu TAURI/4, Alice C. Quillen et al., Astrophysical Journal 612 (September 2004), pp. L137–L140; also arXiv:astro-ph/0406445.
 Pre-main sequence star Proper Motion Catalogue, C. Ducourant et al., Astronomy and Astrophysics 438 (August 2005), pp. 769–778.
 Observational studies of pre-main-sequence evolution, Martin Cohen and Leonard V. Kuhi, Astrophysical Journal Supplement Series 41 (December 1979), pp. 743–843.

Binary stars
T Tauri stars
Circumstellar disks
Taurus (constellation)